Pfulgriesheim is a commune in the Bas-Rhin department in Grand Est in north-eastern France.

It lies northwest of Strasbourg along the D41 road out of the city.

See also
 Communes of the Bas-Rhin department
 Kochersberg

References

Communes of Bas-Rhin
Bas-Rhin communes articles needing translation from French Wikipedia